Paavo Palokangas (born 11 October 1943) is a Finnish sports shooter. He competed at the 1980 Summer Olympics and the 1984 Summer Olympics.

References

1943 births
Living people
Finnish male sport shooters
Olympic shooters of Finland
Shooters at the 1980 Summer Olympics
Shooters at the 1984 Summer Olympics
Sportspeople from Helsinki